Elections to Rochdale Council were held on 3 May 2007.  One third of the council was up for election and the Liberal Democrats gained  control of the council from no overall control.

After the election, the composition of the council was
Liberal Democrat 32
Labour 20
Conservative 8

Election result

Ward results

External links
Rochdale election results

2007 English local elections
2007
2000s in Greater Manchester